Letters Home may refer to:

 Letters Home: Correspondence 1950–1963, a collection of letters written by Sylvia Plath to her family
 Letters Home (News from Babel album), 1986
 Letters Home (The Soldiers album), 2010
 Letters Home (Defeater album), 2013

See also
 Letters from Home (disambiguation)